Reona (stylized as ReoNa, born October 20, 1998) is a Japanese singer who is signed to Sacra Music. Having been active as a cosplayer and independent musician, she made her major debut in 2018 as the singing voice of the character Elza Kanzaki in the anime series Sword Art Online Alternative: Gun Gale Online. Her first single under her own name was released in August 2018.

Career
Reona was born in Kagoshima on October 20, 1998. She became interested in becoming a cosplayer during her elementary school years, as she had been recommended to become one by a classmate. Her interest in cosplay was boosted after ordering a costume of the Vocaloid Hatsune Miku. She became active as a cosplayer while in junior high school, and went under the names  and ReoNa* while attending events such as Comiket 91 in 2016. She had also dreamed of becoming a singer for anime, and had released covers of songs on YouTube.

Reona had her break as a singer in 2017 when she became a finalist in an audition held by the music label Sacra Music. She made her major debut as a singer the following year as the singing voice of the character Elza Kanzaki in the anime series Sword Art Online Alternative: Gun Gale Online. She released the song  on April 15, 2018; the song topped iTunes Japan's anime singles chart as well as Amazon Japan's digital music rankings. This was followed by the release of the digital singles "Step, Step" and "Independence". She released the mini-album Elza on July 4, 2018; the mini-album peaked at No. 8 on Oricon's weekly charts. Her first single under her own name, "Sweet Hurt", was released on August 29, 2018; the title track is used as the ending theme to the anime series Happy Sugar Life. Her second single "forget-me-not" was released digitally on January 13, 2019 and received a physical release on February 6, 2019; the title track is used as the second ending theme to the anime series Sword Art Online: Alicization, and the single also includes the song , which is used as the ending theme for episode 19 of anime series Sword Art Online: Alicization.

ReoNa's feature single "Prologue" was released on June 26, 2019 under the Elza Kanzaki stage name. Her third single "Null" was released on August 28, 2019. She released her fourth single "Anima" digitally on July 13, 2020, and received a physical release on July 22, 2020; the title song is being used as the opening theme of television series anime Sword Art Online: Alicization - War of Underworld: Part 2 . ReoNa sang "Scar/let" as the opening for the video game Sword Art Online Alicization Lycoris, as well as appearing in the game as a playable character. She released her first album, Unknown, on October 7, 2020.

ReoNa collaborated with Hiroyuki Sawano on the song "time"; the song was used as  the ending theme to the anime series The Seven Deadly Sins: Dragon's Judgement. She released her fifth single "Nai Nai" on May 12, 2021; the title song was used as the ending theme to the first season of the anime series Shadows House. Her sixth single "Shall We Dance?" was released on July 27, 2022; it was used as the opening theme of the second season of Shadows House. ReoNa's single "Alive" was used as the opening theme for the anime Arknights: Prelude To Dawn. Her song "VITA" was featured as the theme song in the video game Sword Art Online: Last Recollection. She released her second studio album, HUMAN, on March 8, 2023.

Discography

As Elza Kanzaki

Singles

Mini-albums

As Reona

Albums

Mini-albums

Singles

As lead artist

Digital singles

As featured artist

Awards and nominations

Notes

 The singles were released as digital downloads.

References

External links
 

1998 births
Living people
Singers from Tokyo
Anime singers
Musicians from Kagoshima Prefecture
Japanese women pop singers
Sacra Music artists
21st-century Japanese singers
21st-century Japanese women singers
Ryukyuan people